Persicula margotae is a species of sea snail, a marine gastropod mollusk, in the family Cystiscidae.

Description
The length of the shell attains 8.1 mm.

Distribution
This species is endemic to the Saudi Arabian part of the Red Sea.

References

margotae
Gastropods described in 2015